Qu Chunyu (born 20 July 1996) is a Chinese short track speed skater. She competed in the women's 500 metres at the 2018 Winter Olympics. and at the 2022 Winter Olympics, in 2000 metre mixed relay winning a gold medal, and Women's 3000 metre relay, winning a bronze medal.

References

External links
 

1996 births
Living people
Chinese female short track speed skaters
Olympic short track speed skaters of China
Short track speed skaters at the 2018 Winter Olympics
Short track speed skaters at the 2022 Winter Olympics
Olympic gold medalists for China
Olympic bronze medalists for China
Olympic medalists in short track speed skating
Medalists at the 2022 Winter Olympics
Sportspeople from Heilongjiang
Asian Games medalists in short track speed skating
Short track speed skaters at the 2017 Asian Winter Games
Asian Games silver medalists for China
Medalists at the 2017 Asian Winter Games
World Short Track Speed Skating Championships medalists
Short track speed skaters at the 2012 Winter Youth Olympics
21st-century Chinese women